"The Nutcracker" was a special Christmas presentation of the CBS television series, Playhouse 90, featuring Tchaikovsky's ballet performed by the New York City Ballet, choreographed by George Balanchine, and conducted by Robert Irving. It was broadcast live and in color on December 25, 1958.

Cast
The cast included the following:

 June Lockhart as narrator
 Diana Adams as Sugar Plum Fairy
 Allegra Kent as Dewdrop
 Judith Green as Marzipan Sheperdess
 Arthur Mitchell as Coffee
 Roy Tobias as Chocolate
 Barbara Walczak as Chocolate
 Kenneth Peterson as Mouse King
 Deni Lamont as Tea
 Edward Villella as Candy Cane
 Una Kai as Frau Silberhaus
 Roland Vazquez as Dr. Silberhaus
 Shaun O'Brien as Party Guest
 Bern Bennett as Announcer
 Debbie Paine as Clara
 Robert Maiorano as Her Prince

Production
The program aired on December 25, 1958, on the CBS television series Playhouse 90. John Houseman was the producer and Ralph Nelson the director. George Balanchine was the choreographer (this was an adaptation of the version he first staged in 1954), and Robert Irving conducted the New York City Ballet Orchestra. E.T.A. Hoffman wrote the television adaptation based on the original narration by Leo Lerman. The broadcast was sponsored by Kimberly-Clark and the American Gas Association. This was the only installment of the entire Playhouse 90 series to be broadcast in color. The videotaped broadcast has been uploaded to YouTube.

References

1958 American television episodes
Playhouse 90 (season 3) episodes
1958 television plays
New York City Ballet